The Mon–Fayette Expressway Bridge, officially the PFC. Ronald C. "Smokey" Bakewell Bridge is a high-level girder bridge that carries vehicular traffic across the Monongahela River between Luzerne Township in Fayette County, Pennsylvania and Centerville in Washington County, Pennsylvania.

The bridge was opened on July 6, 2012 and completed the southern section of Pennsylvania Route 43, more commonly known as the Mon–Fayette Expressway. Upon completion, motorists can now travel via freeway for 58 miles (93 km) between Morgantown, West Virginia and the Pittsburgh suburb of Jefferson Hills, Pennsylvania. The cost of the bridge project was $96 million. The total length of the bridge is 3,022 feet; 51,000 cubic yards of concrete were used to create the structure. In 2013, the Pennsylvania Legislature voted to name the bridge for Private First Class Ronald C. "Smokey" Bakewell, a local serviceman killed during the Vietnam War. Bakewell lived within a half of a mile of where the bridge stands today. He was a member of Charlie Troop, First Battalion, Fifth Regiment, of the First Air Cavalry.

See also
List of crossings of the Monongahela River

References

Bridges over the Monongahela River
Road bridges in Pennsylvania
Concrete bridges in the United States
Girder bridges in the United States
Bridges in Fayette County, Pennsylvania
Bridges in Washington County, Pennsylvania